José Narciso Díaz (born 31 October 1950) is a Cuban fencer. He competed in the individual and team sabre events at the 1968 Summer Olympics.

References

1950 births
Living people
People from Artemisa
Cuban male fencers
Olympic fencers of Cuba
Fencers at the 1968 Summer Olympics